Knock 'Em Dead, Kid is the third  album by Canadian rock band Trooper, released in 1977. The album was produced by Randy Bachman of Bachman-Turner Overdrive and The Guess Who fame. Bassist Harry Kalensky was replaced by Doni Underhill prior to the recording this album, which was the group's first Canadian platinum certified album. The album contained the hits "We're Here for a Good Time (not a long time)" and "Oh, Pretty Lady". It was recorded at the Phase 1 studio, Scarborough, Ontario, Canada. Randy Bachman plays lead guitar on "Two for the show".

Track listing
All songs by McGuire/Smith except where noted.

Side One
 "Knock 'Em Dead Kid" - 4:46
 "Waiting on Your Love" (Ludwig) - 4:22
 "Most of the Country" - 3:36
 "You Look So Good" (McGuire/Smith/Ludwig) - 4:51

Side Two
 "We're Here for a Good Time (Not a Long Time)" - 3:34
 "Oh, Pretty Lady" - 4:35
 "Cold, Cold Toronto" (McGuire/Underhill) - 3:27
 "(It's Been a) Long Time" - 5:06

Band members

 Vocals - Ra McGuire
 Guitar - Brian Smith
 Drums - Tommy Stewart
 Bass - Doni Underhill
 Keyboards - Frank Ludwig

Singles

 "Oh, Pretty Lady" / "(It's Been A) Long Time"
 "We're Here For A Good Time (Not A Long Time)" / "Loretta"

References

Trooper (band) albums
1977 albums